14 Bis is a Brazilian pop-rock band. The band took its name from Santos-Dumont's 14 Bis airplane.

The band was formed in 1979 in the state of Minas Gerais, when the members of two bands, O Terço and "Bendegó" decided to merge. Flávio Venturini and Vermelho, two founding members of 14 Bis, were also members of the Clube da Esquina band.

Música popular brasileira is a strong element in many of 14 Bis compositions. The influence of progressive rock and caipira (hillbilly) is evident in many of its compositions, such as in their use of analog keyboards and complex vocal arrangements.

The group reached the peak of their success during the 1980s with notable compositions and performance of popular Brazilian songs. Due to the mild, often happy and soothing theme of many of its compositions, the band was quite popular among children.

Discography

Studio albums 
(1979) 14 Bis
(1980) 14 Bis II
 (1981) Espelhos das Águas
 (1982) Além Paraíso
 (1983) A Idade da Luz
 (1985) A Nave Vai
 (1987) Sete
 (1992) Quatro por Quatro
 (1996) Siga o Sol
 (1999) Bis
 (2004) Outros Planos

Live albums 

(1988) 14 Bis ao Vivo
 (2007) 14 Bis ao Vivo
(2020) 14 Bis Acústico ao Vivo

DVDs 

(2007) 14 Bis ao Vivo
(2020) 14 Bis Acústico ao Vivo

References

External links
 Official Website (in Portuguese)
 
 

Musical groups established in 1979
Brazilian rock music groups
Música popular brasileira musical groups
Musical groups from Belo Horizonte
1979 establishments in Brazil